The Sheffield United F.C. Player of the Year is an annual award presented to players of Sheffield United on behalf of the club's fans to recognise an outstanding contribution to the previous season.  First presented in 1967 the award was organised by the Official Supporters Club and voted for by its members.  The award was officially recognised and commemorated by the club and since the late 1990s has been presented at a gala dinner.  From around 2000 the award was widened to include voting from the general fanbase and various other awards have also been presented including Young Player of the Year and Goal of the Season.

Explanation of list

Appearances
Appearances and goals are listed for the season for which the player won the award.  Only competitive fixtures are included in the statistics.  These include:
Football League and Premier League
Play-off matches
FA Cup, Football League Cup, Football League Trophy, Full Members Cup, Texaco Cup, Anglo-Scottish Cup, Anglo-Italian Cup
Friendly matches, exhibition games, and pre-season tournaments are excluded from the figures.

Table headers
Season – Seasons run from August until May with the award being presented in April or May for the proceeding season.  Awards are listed as the year of season end.
Level – The league and level at which the season was played.  Division One was the highest level in English football until the formation of the Premier League in 1992–93 after which Division One became the second tier. In 2004–05 The Championship was formed as the new second tier with League One and Two making up the remainder of the Football League.
Nationality – The player's officially recognised FIFA nationality.  A player may have been born in one country but represented another nation through family ancestry.
Apps – The number of games played in the season including any substitute appearances.
Goals – The number of goals scored in the season.
Notes – Further info on the award.

Winners

Wins by player
Players who have won the award more than once.

Wins by playing position

Wins by nationality

Young player of the year

References
General

Specific

Player of the Year
Player of the Year
Association football player of the year awards by club in England
Association football player non-biographical articles